Saturday Night Oldies was a Saturday-night music and talk show on WABC Radio in New York City.

History 

WABC Radio (770 AM, New York City) played rock and roll from 1960 until May 10, 1982, before changing to a talk radio format. With talk shows not quite as popular on the weekend, Tim McCarthy, WABC President and General Manager, and Phil Boyce, Operations Manager and Program Director, decided to bring back the oldies music on Saturday nights. Saturday Night Oldies premiered on December 3, 2005, exactly six months after WCBS-FM (also in New York) dropped the oldies format on June 3, 2005. 

Mark Simone hosted the show, which featured popular music from the late 1950s through the 1970s with an emphasis on songs that became popular, but have largely been forgotten. Original WABC jingles from the station's Top 40 era were played and Simone took phone calls and reads posts from the Message Board discussing a wide variety of events in popular culture from that time period.

The crew included Mike Gunzelman, the producer, and Mike Savilli on controls.

In July 2009 the show was renamed Saturday Night and shortened to 3 hours, airing from 6 PM to 9 PM. Newer music was played, as well as oldies, and a wider range of guests from the entertainment world were interviewed along with more discussion of entertainment issues.

In September 2010 the show was shortened to two hours, from 7 to 9 PM. It was also announced at that time that the Saturday Night show would soon be going national, and would be syndicated to stations in other cities.

The show was heard for the last time in December 2012 when Mark Simone resigned from WABC and joined WOR where he is heard Monday - Friday from 10 AM - 12 noon.

Features
 B-sides of 45s played
 Beatlespectacular  - in-depth look at the Beatles
 Fake breaks – old radio and TV commercials
 Mystery DJ - guess the voice of a radio deejay
 Stump the Host - callers try to stump the show’s host
 Triple plays - 3 songs from one recording artist played

Guest interviews
 Herb Oscar Anderson
 Paul Anka
 Little Anthony
 Peter Asher and Gordon Waller of Peter & Gordon
 Frankie Avalon
 Burt Bacharach
 Frank Bank
 Shirley Bassey
 Pete Best
 Jay Black of Jay and the Americans
 Pat Boone
 Tom Bosley
 Dewey Bunnell of America
 Eric Burdon
 Glen Campbell
 The Captain & Tennille
 David Cassidy
 Dick Cavett
 Chubby Checker
 Lou Christie
 Petula Clark
 Tim Conway
 Stu Cook of Creedence Clearwater Revival	
 Alice Cooper
 Pat Cooper
 Paul Cowsill of The Cowsills
 Tony Danza	
 Bo Diddley
 Phyllis Diller
 Dion DiMucci
 Micky Dolenz
 Donovan
 Tony Dow
 Barbara Eden
 Fabian Forte
 Peter Frampton
 Art Garfunkel
 Bobby Goldsboro
 Lesley Gore
 Al Green
 Harry Harrison
 Deborah Harry
 Isaac Hayes
 Dwayne Hickman
 Janis Ian
 Dan Ingram
 Tommy James
 Frank Jeckell of the 1910 Fruitgum Company
 Davy Jones
 Shirley Jones
 Larry Kane
 Paul Kantner of Jefferson Airplane and Jefferson Starship
 Ben E. King  and Charlie Thomas of the Drifters
 Frank Kingston Smith
 Robert Klein
 Bernie Kopell
 Billy J. Kramer
 Steve Lawrence
 David Letterman
 Eddie Levert and Walter Williams of The O'Jays
 Gary Lewis of the Playboys
 Little Richard
 Barry Livingston
 Airrion Love of The Stylistics
 Mike Love of The Beach Boys
 Ron Lundy
 Barry Manilow
 Jerry Mathers
 Johnny Mathis
 Marilyn McCoo and Billy Davis Jr. of The 5th Dimension
 Maureen McGovern
 Don McLean
 Ed McMahon
 George Michael
 Eddie Money
 Mary Tyler Moore
 Bruce Morrow
 David Nelson
 Julie Newmar
 Wayne Newton
 Peter Noone of the Herman's Hermits
 Tony Orlando
 Donny Osmond
 Gary Owens
 Lisa Marie Presley
 Gary Puckett
 Kenny Rogers
 Freddie Roman
 Linda Ronstadt
 Rose Marie
 Todd Rundgren
 Bobby Rydell
 Mort Sahl
 John Sebastian
 Neil Sedaka
 Bob Shannon
 Scott Shannon
 Patrick Simmons of The Doobie Brothers
 Nancy Sinatra
 Jaclyn Smith
 Frankie Valli
 Bobby Vinton
 Jimmy Webb
 Adam West
 Barry Williams
 Jo Anne Worley
 Alan Young
 John Zacherley
 Kool & the Gang
 Dick Van Dyke
 Joe Namath
 Gloria Gaynor

Slogans
 "Saturday Night Oldies. What an awesome idea!"
 "Who else could pull this off?"
 "Around here we STILL play the hits!"
 "This is the station you grew up with. Who said you had to grow up?"

External links
 Saturday Night Oldies Message Board
 Mark Simone Official Web Site
 WABC Radio

American music radio programs